is a fast-food chain on Okinawa Island, with five restaurants in and around Naha (Yonabaru, Tomigusuku, Nishihara). They sport a menu featuring many homemade Okinawan specialties such as gōyā burger, "Nūyaru" (gōyā and pork burger), hamburgers with a filling of SPAM and bitter melon omelet. They also have fried gōyā rings, similar to onion rings, and gōyā juice. Besides these more Okinawan-tailored offerings they also have normal ham- and cheeseburgers. The first restaurant opened on January 29, 1986.

See also
 List of hamburger restaurants

External links
Jef Official Homepage 

1986 establishments in Japan
Companies based in Okinawa Prefecture
Fast-food chains of Japan
Fast-food hamburger restaurants
Okinawan cuisine
Restaurants established in 1986